Events from the year 1786 in Denmark.

Incumbents
 Monarch – Christian VII
 Prime minister – Andreas Peter Bernstorff

Events

 4 March – The sc hool Efterslægtselskabets skole is founded in Copenhagen.
 27 April  HDMS Indfødsretten is launched at Nyholm in Copenhagen.
 25 August – The Great Agrivultural Commission (Den Store Landbokommision) is set up with the task of rethinking the relationship between landowners and tenant farmers. It is formally abolished in 1816 but is inactive from 1802.
 26 September  Christian VII visits London.

Undated
 The Danish–Icelandic Trade Monopoly ends.
 Foundation of Madam Lindes Institut.

Births
 3 January – Ole Jørgen Rawert, government official and topographic painter (died 1851)
 12 March – Bendix Grodtschilling the Youngest, painter (died 1737)
 28 January – Nathaniel Wallich, botanist (died 1854)
 15 September – Frederik Treschow, supreme court attorney, politician, landowner and philanthropist (died 1869)
 18 September – Christian VIII, King of Denmark (died 1848)

Deaths
 January 8 — Johan Mandelberg, painter (born 1733)
 16 March – Cecilie Christine Schøller, socialite  (born 1720).
 December 29 – Johan Herman Wessel, poet, playwright (born 1742)

References

 
Denmark
Years of the 18th century in Denmark